Hibakujumoku  (also called survivor tree or A-bombed tree in English) is a Japanese term for a tree that survived the atomic bombings of Hiroshima and Nagasaki in 1945.

Damage 
The heat emitted by the explosion in Hiroshima within the first three seconds at a distance of three kilometres from the hypocenter was about 40 times greater than that from the Sun. The initial radiation level at the hypocenter was approximately 240 Gy. According to Hiroshima and Nagasaki: The Physical, Medical, and Social Effects of the Atomic Bombings, plants suffered damage only in the portions exposed above ground, while portions underground were not directly damaged.

Regeneration  
The rate of regeneration differed by species. Active regeneration was shown by broad-leaved trees. Approximately 170 trees that grew in Hiroshima in 2011 had actually been there prior to the bombing. The oleander was designated the official flower of Hiroshima for its remarkable vitality.

Types of hibakujumoku 
Hibakujumoku species are listed in the UNITAR database, shown below, combined with data from Hiroshima and Nagasaki: The Physical, Medical, and Social Effects of the Atomic Bombings. A more extensive list, including distance from the hypocenter for each tree, is available in Survivors: The A-bombed Trees of Hiroshima.

List

Surviving trees in Nagasaki 
Although not as well known as the hibakujumoku in Hiroshima, there are a number of similar survivors in the vicinity of the hypocenter in Nagasaki. Approximately 50 of these trees have been documented in English.

See also
 List of individual trees

References

Atomic bombings of Hiroshima and Nagasaki
Trees of Japan
Individual trees in Japan
Radiation effects